Abbottina rivularis (Chinese false gudgeon or Amur false gudgeon) is a species of ray-finned fish in the family Cyprinidae, the carps and minnows. It is native to China, Korea, and Japan. It has been introduced to the Mekong River Basin and it is also known from rivers in Turkmenistan.

Description
This species is mature at about 4 or 5 centimeters in length, and the maximum recorded length was 18.9 centimeters. It has eight dark spots along its lateral line and many black dots on its caudal fin.

Distribution and Habitat
This freshwater fish lives in rivers and lakes, and it is often found in converted lowland aquatic habitat, such as irrigation ditches and ponds associated with rice paddies.

Biology
This fish is host to a number of recorded parasites, including the monogenean flatworms Gyrodactylus rivularae and G. gobioninum, several trematode flatworms of the genus Diplostomum, and the tapeworm Khawia abbottinae.

References

Further reading
Yan, Y. Z. and Y. F. Chen. (2007). Changes in the life history of Abbottina rivularis in Lake Fuxian. Journal of Fish Biology 70(3), 959–64.

rivularis
Fish described in 1855